This is a list of members of the Chamber of Deputies of Romania, elected following the Romanian legislative election, 2016.

References